"Show Me How" is a song recorded by R&B group the Emotions for their 1971 album Untouched. It was released as the album's first single in September 1971 by Volt Records and reached No. 11 on the Cashbox Top R&B Singles chart and No. 13 on the Billboard Hot R&B Singles chart.

Overview
"Show Me How" was produced and arranged by Isaac Hayes who composed the song along with David Porter. With a duration of 3 minutes and 4 seconds the song was also arranged by Hayes and Dale Warren.

Critical reception
Cashbox described Show Me How as an "enticing ballad".

Samples
"Show Me How" was sampled by Awon on the track Undefeated off his 2013 album For the Grimy (Searching for Soulville).

Appearances in other media
During November 1971 The Emotions performed Show Me How on an episode of Soul Train.

References

1971 songs
1971 singles
The Emotions songs
Stax Records singles
Songs written by Isaac Hayes
Songs written by David Porter (musician)